Theodore Zeldin   (born 22 August 1933) is an Oxford scholar and thinker whose books have searched for answers to three questions:  Where can a person look to find more inspiring ways of spending each day and each year? What ambitions remain unexplored, beyond happiness, prosperity, faith, love, technology or therapy? What role could there be for individuals with independent minds, or who feel isolated or different, or misfits? Each of Zeldin's books illuminates from a different angle of what people can do today, that they could not in previous centuries.

Personal life
Theodore Zeldin was born on the slopes of Mount Carmel on 22 August 1933, the son of Russian-Jewish parents who later chose to become naturalised British subjects. His father was a civil engineer, an expert in bridge-building, a colonel in the Russian Czarist Army and a socialist who rejected the Bolsheviks; his mother, the daughter of an industrialist, was a dentist who completed her training in Vienna. Escaping from the Russian Civil War, they emigrated to Palestine, where he worked for the British Colonial Service building railways, but was disappointed by the failure of the movement for Arab-Jewish solidarity which, together with other scientists and intellectuals, he favoured, and of which the railwaymen's trade union was a vocal advocate.
Theodore Zeldin was educated at the English School Heliopolis (a mixed-sex boarding school) and at Aylesbury Grammar School. He graduated from London University (Birkbeck College) at the age of 17 in philosophy, history and Latin and then from Oxford University (Christ Church) in modern history, with Firsts from both, followed by a doctorate at the newly established St Antony's College, Oxford. He has been a fellow of St Antony's since 1957 (now Emeritus); he was its dean for thirteen years and played a leading role in developing it as the university's centre for international studies. Now as an Associate Fellow of Green-Templeton College Oxford, he is active in its Future of Work project.

Zeldin has been elected a Fellow of the British Academy and of the Royal Society of Literature, and a member of the European Academy. He has been decorated as a Commander of the Order of the British Empire, a Commander of the Légion d'Honneur and a Commander of the Order of Arts and Letters of France, and with Britain's top award for History, the Wolfson Prize. He has been married to Deirdre Wilson, the co-inventor of Relevance Theory, since 1975; they live in an Art Deco house outside Oxford. He gives his recreations as 'gardening, painting and mending things'.

A History of French Passions
When this book of two thousand pages, the fruit of twenty years of research, was published (re-issued in five volumes: Ambition and Love, Intellect and Pride, Taste and Corruption, Politics and Anger, Anxiety and Hypocrisy), the Revue française de science politique wrote that ‘there has never been anything like it’ and that possibly ‘nothing would ever be the same again’. It was surprising, first of all, by its scope. Instead of a narrative of public events, it described private emotions, the variations in the way people of many kinds worried, got bored, were hysterical or happy, ate, drank, danced, joked, experienced the pleasures and frustrations of childhood, education and marriage, behaved in their interactions between women and men, found satisfactions and suffering in a wide range of occupations and professions,  made friends and enemies, sought privileges for themselves and protested against those of others, argued about taste in art, fashion, domestic decoration and literature (serious and junk), played sports, enjoyed music, read newspapers, performed as bureaucrats and technocrats, manipulated one another with verbosity or hypocrisy, faced old age and death and much more. It looked at each subject from unaccustomed perspectives, backed by a vast range of historical evidence, hitherto neglected even by French specialists. The Times Literary Supplement wrote: ‘One emerges from several days of total immersion a bit dazed, scarcely knowing what to admire more about Dr Zeldin, his energy, his erudition, his imagination or his courage’.
Secondly, Zeldin treats each human activity as deserving of equal attention and having a more or less independent vitality. The structures and ideologies that are generally assumed to hold society together he sees as influencing only a small part of people's lives. Addressing his French audience in the preface to the French translation, he wrote: ’My aim is to undress you’, explaining that he wished to separate them from the myths they had inherited like hand-me-down clothes: the lives of ordinary people could not be summed up as a search for justice, glory or any other ideal; he wished to include all their contradictions and hesitations, to reveal the complexity of their individual reactions in the face of both personal fears and outside pressures, to distinguish between what they thought, what they said and what they did, to examine their illusions about themselves and the process that led them to accept these illusions as truths. ‘To avoid repeating the received ideas about the past, I have burrowed into as many aspects of life as possible, that erudition has not hitherto explored.’
Thirdly, the book contains innumerable intimate ‘portraits in prose’ of individuals from every social group, emphasising the private life behind the public persona, and the unpublicised motivations concealed in ideas and ambitions, as though scrutinising humanity at the atomic level and finding every atom different, every character unique and many-sided, composed of a mass of smaller particles. The old generalisations about classes and parties melt away. Zeldin is the historian of human complexity, of the unpredictability of human interaction, and of the battles waging between muddled feelings inside every self, every family, every workplace. He diverts attention away from legalistic regulations to the cunning subterfuges people use to bend or avoid them, and he does so with a humour which is most often gentle but sometimes ferocious.

Some readers were troubled, or even angered, by the book's challenge to so many deeply held convictions and by its unconventional construction, juxtaposing seemingly unrelated passions and showing unsuspected resonances between them, in preference to links of cause and effect or chronological narrative. Some deplored that he was defying the duty of a historian to provide all-embracing explanations of the events of the past. Some did not appreciate his downplaying the influence of political and ideological divisions on daily life. Others complained that he gave prominence to subjects different from those studied in history classes at school or university and so would not help students to pass their examinations. Zeldin's picture of reality is indeed deliberately fragmented, with clashing sensitivities fomenting uncontrollable turbulence; he scavenges through the debris of disagreement and difference so as to view life from multiple perspectives.

The explanation, said one reviewer, was that Zeldin combined ‘the interests of the novelist with the techniques of the historian… He is a modern Balzac, but one capable of supporting his assertions with statistics.’ ‘He is our new La Bruyère’, said another, because of the prominence he gave to character and temperament and the absurdities they generate. The book ‘reads like a novel’, said a third, with a ‘succession of dazzling portraits, of surprising revelations, and of analyses which fascinate and disturb at the same time’.
It evoked an atmosphere of a country in which everyone was talking at the same time and could not hear what others said, but, yet another reviewer concluded, Zeldin ‘succeeded in solving the problem of describing chaos and confusion in a way which does not distort them… Occasionally books appear which can immediately be identified as classics; to wait for the judgement of posterity is entirely unnecessary. Theodore Zeldin’s book…has just taken its legitimate place on the shelf beside Gibbon, Burckhardt and the other giants’.
Other reviewers added: ‘Truly a work of genius’.
‘One of the major works of our collective lifetime’
‘He has carried history to a rare summit. He amuses, irritates and instructs… This is one of the greatest history books of this century, without the least doubt, irreplaceable.’ 
‘A master is among us’

The French

Zeldin completed his history with an investigation of the manners and preoccupations of contemporary French people. Once more he redraws the lines produced by averages and statistics, using portraits based on his own personal conversations with a huge variety of people, sometimes in unusual places, like the Communist Party School for training militants (where he is impressed by the quality of the food), the elite National School of Administration (where he analyses the quality of the ambitions of students competing for the top jobs), and a mental hospital where he spends three days discussing both reality and fantasy with the inmates. His conclusion is that there are as many minorities in France as there are inhabitants. Instead of advising on monuments or ruins to visit, Zeldin treats each person as a monument to be deciphered and appreciated. Each of the thirty chapters attempts to lay bare how relationships and dilemmas are lived at a personal level, under such titles as 'What lovers want from each other', 'Why it is becoming harder to find and keep a spouse', 'How to be friends with a peasant', 'How to be chic', 'How not to be intimidated by their intellectuals', 'What becomes of the drop outs', and 'How to laugh at their jokes'. He illustrates the text with cartoons by prominent humorists mocking hypocrisy and platitude.

‘It makes a capital discovery', wrote a Paris professor of political science. 'Zeldin offers profound modifications of the analyses which, following Tocqueville, are generally proposed about France's problems. Its intelligence and rigour are fascinating'.
Whereas Tocqueville famously predicted that democracy would make people more and more alike, Zeldin discovers the opposite, that they become more different. And the reactions in the media showed how divided they were. 'The French, I know them, you may say. But everything here will surprise you.'
‘He understands us better than those who govern us, than our spouses, our bosses and our children.' 'His book is not just funny, it is intelligent, loving, caustic, learned, lively, serious, brilliant…sweeping away all the stereotypes.'
However, Zeldin's picture, 'warts and all', including the dark side of admired institutions, disturbed those who resented their cherished beliefs being undermined. In particular, the challenge to the concept of national identity aroused a long debate about it, though no agreement emerged as to what France's national identity was, the country's whole history being endless dispute as to what it should be. Whereas some saw the book as 'a love letter' to the French people, written with 'humour and friendship', others complained that the book was 'cruel' and 'hostile'.

In a ceremony in Zeldin's honour, the French Ambassador in London said that his books 'caused a sensation in France. You are no doubt the person from outside France who has best analysed, decoded and understood us. It's often been through reading you that I've found the most pertinent observations on our country and its complexity – observations that are sometimes cruel, always accurate, and also imbued with great friendship and, I would say, almost tenderness… An observer who is at once critical and loving, demanding and generous, you are without equal in holding up to us a mirror that accurately reflects both our virtues and our failings. Indeed, you seek meticulously to understand us and to improve not only your compatriots' understanding of the French – and hence our ability to work better together – but also relationships between human beings in general.'

Happiness 
Zeldin has said in press interviews that France has been his ‘laboratory’, its people were his ‘guinea-pigs’, who could, thanks to their rich literature and long tradition of articulacy and free debate, provide an introduction to many of the problems and delights of being alive.
It was not surprising that his next project was an investigation of human values on an international scale, because all the desires and animosities he had studied in France extended beyond national boundaries and beyond the centuries he had written about. He took happiness, which he called ‘the world’s fastest growing religion’, as his theme, and used what he called ‘free history’ to unravel its ambiguities.

In this book he imagines what would happen if all humans could be successful, if they could attain total bliss, if all disease was eliminated and if death itself could be endlessly postponed. It is written in the form of a satirical fable about a young woman who obtains a tourist visa for a holiday in Paradise, where she discovers that the inhabitants, both famous and obscure, are not as comfortable as she expected; they are still struggling with peculiarities of character from which they can no more free themselves than they could on earth. The bizarre situations they find themselves in, and the antics they get up to, are fictitious, but everything about what they did and said on earth is historically exact. People who would have preferred to have lived in a different century discover that they can do so in Paradise, which is divided like a multi-storey car park with each century on a different level, and no one is condemned to exist for all eternity among fashions they detest. Lost souls can devote themselves to correcting misapprehensions about themselves, since few ever felt they were fully understood by their contemporaries. Henry Ford, for example, continues to be angrily resentful of the criticism he received when alive, and he becomes a preacher of his own Gospel, trying to convert God to it, expounding his beliefs about the dangers of making a profit – which the businessmen of his time could never appreciate. Paradise is where many, exhausted by life, want nothing more than undisturbed sleep, and, above all, where it becomes clear that there are other goals apart from happiness. Zeldin argues that happiness is too easily converted into self-satisfaction and complacency, and he asks how people can claim to be happy when there is so much suffering and sorrow around them and when they have themselves experienced so little of life.

This book was variously seen as an answer to Orwell's pessimistic vision of the future, as a 'wickedly funny and very wise satire', as a burlesque of academic illusions, and as 'the maddest novel ever written'. It attracted particular attention from women commentators, who called it 'one of the most significant books of our time', 'pointing out paths hitherto unnoticed rather than giving lessons', 'as sparkling as champagne'; and who appreciated the sleeping souls: ‘People are too tired to be happy’. ‘Here is our new Pico de la Mirandola’, wrote one (exhuming the 15th century philosopher whose Oration on the Dignity of Man has been called ‘the Manifesto of the Renaissance’); this was ‘culture personified’, others liked ‘the charm of erudition combined with an overflowing imagination’, or the union of ‘knowledge and humour’. 
Zeldin explained his ‘free history’ as a rebellion against scholarship being condemned to use only classical forms of presentation, he was attempting to give history the freedom to do what abstract art had done to traditional representational art, to enlarge the range of discoveries it could make. He wanted to reveal more of  ‘the human factor which, despite all efforts to regiment it, is an unfailing source of surprises’, and to change the way people looked at the past, by making them more aware of how much what they saw differed from what others saw.

Happiness marks the expansion of Zeldin's interest into philosophical history, not philosophy in the academic sense, but the extraction of wisdom out of reflection on the disappointments and achievements of the past. By surveying the whole course of humanity's wanderings across the centuries, people could now view the possibilities of life differently, in the same way that artists painting landscapes differently transformed ideas of natural beauty.

An Intimate History of Humanity

Next, Zeldin turned to the seemingly insuperable obstacle in the way of human fulfilment, the obstinate survival of fear, hatred and greed, and to the turmoil produced by conflicting emotions. The Intimate History is the book that has won him his widest audience, all over the world, and it continues to be reprinted and discovered afresh by succeeding generations.
It is history made directly relevant to contemporary concerns, and at the same time it enriches the meaning of contemporary concerns. By analysing how the expression of emotions changed in different civilisations and centuries, it shows the limits of the idea of an immutable ‘human nature’. Though it points to escape routes out of present-day discontents, it also reminds that escape often leads to unpleasant surprises. Zeldin replaces stability with unpredictability.

Each of the twenty-five chapters shows how a ‘fact of life’ which seems impossible to change becomes far less inflexible when its variations through the centuries are understood. The chapter ‘Why there has been more progress in cooking than in sex’ is an example of how a juxtaposition of apparently disconnected themes can give a new meaning to sexual obsessions. The same juxtaposition is applied in the chapter on loneliness, where the history of research into the immune system is placed alongside suffering in solitude, to produce an unexpected understanding of it. The book presents personal relationships as the crucial element in determining the quality of life, and it seeks answers to such questions as: How has the desire that men feel for women, and for other men, altered through the centuries? Why has it become increasingly difficult to destroy one's enemies? How have people freed themselves from fear by finding new fears? Why has friendship between men and women been so fragile? Why is the crisis in the family only one stage in the evolution of generosity?  Each chapter begins with a conversation with a woman discussing what she makes of life, and then introduces evidence from other civilisations, past and present, suggesting that other options might be open to her, if she only situated her problems in a wider time frame. This is a history of the world that takes as its subject the worries and uncertainties that all humans share, irrespective of where and when they have lived, rather than chronicling the rise and fall of disconnected empires and economies. It is also a personal demonstration by the author of how one person can relate with less bewilderment to the whole of humanity's endless floundering through mistakes and elusive hopes.

‘The most exciting and ambitious work of non-fiction I have read in more than a decade’, wrote a reviewer, but with the arrival of the internet it became possible for readers from many countries to record different explanations of the book's significance.
‘He does not speak contemptuously of anyone’. ‘People who wish to escape from the group or the institutions of their time, and the opinions of the crowd, and indeed from ordinary life, are not misfits in modern society, their roots go back…’ ‘I could not figure out why the book made me feel enraged.’  ‘There is so much wisdom here’, wrote a doctor, ‘so many rich historical threads, reading it is like eating a chocolate cake; each chapter is entirely enough to savour for a while but you cannot wait to go back for more’. However, as with Zeldin's other books, there were people who wanted life to be simplified, rather than having its complexity displayed. One complained that he could not find an ‘underlying message’. Another replied that the book ‘drives the reader to get involved in every way and make his own beliefs and thoughts.’  ‘I took the book off the shelf in the bookshop, opened it somewhere in the middle to read a few sentences and was hooked. The wealth of his learning is amazing, the way he weaves together different disciplines, civilisations, ideas and ages is very eloquent and beautifully executed’.  On the other hand, readers who said the portraits were ‘the best part of the book’ and ‘engrossing’ were contradicted by the person who preferred ‘the historical parts’, and was ‘no fan of biography, especially biographies of unknown anonymous people I don’t know…it is beyond my strength.’ On occasion, the book overcame the distaste for history that schools can instil:  ‘It is the first book of history I fell in love with. Still in love.’ ‘I’ve given out over a dozen copies of the book to friends and the like, and there’s near universal approval.’  ‘For years after I read it I could not put it back on a bookshelf. To do so was like admitting that the reading was over, while I just wanted to keep exploring everything this book offered and opened up.’ ‘One of the few books I read again periodically.’ It is ‘convenient to read randomly’, opening it at any page. ‘Had me sometimes stopping after every rich sentence to ponder some connection with my work or life.’ Others dismissed the book as ‘waffle’ and ‘garbage’.

The National Museum of Australia, inspired by the book, translated Zeldin's method into an exhibition of the emotions of the Australians, explaining them by delving into their memories of the past. In support of this rejection of the convention that nations define themselves by recounting their achievements in chronological order, it quoted this passage from Zeldin's preface: ‘You will not find history laid out in these pages as it is in museums, with each empire and each period carefully separated. I am writing about what will not lie still, about the past which is alive in people’s minds today.’

Conversation

Originally a series of six twenty-minute talks broadcast on BBC Radio 4, this book, illustrated with Zeldin's own paintings, introduces the idea of ‘the New Conversation’. Unlike traditional conversation, where people are governed by rules of etiquette and custom, and talk to pass the time, or cement social links, or argue or persuade, he envisages conversation as ‘a meeting of minds with different memories and habits. When minds meet, they don’t just exchange facts, they transform them…Conversation doesn’t just reshuffle the cards: it creates new cards’, and it involves being willing to emerge a slightly different person.’ Instead of lamenting the decline of conversation, he shows the limitations of conversation in the past; instead of offering a few simple techniques to improve conversation, he demonstrates how every new era has changed the subject and style of conversation, modifying the relationships of lovers, families, work colleagues and strangers. He describes how women have changed the way lovers speak, how families have attempted to avoid boredom or silence, how specialisation in work has made it difficult for people to understand one another’s jargon, and what role there is now for the tongue-tied and the shy. The development of conversation thus becomes more than a way of making social contacts more pleasant; every time two people talk with honesty and mutual understanding, they change the world by a minute amount; when they listen and say what is deepest inside them, they create equality between two people, more effectively than any law. The ‘structured conversations’ of the Oxford Muse Foundation (see below) put these ideas into practice in corporations, public services, universities and organisations of many kinds.

‘I have discussed this book with people who have not read it,' is one comment. 'Passionate conversation has resulted.' ‘I have learned quite a bit about myself from this book. For example, I learned I am an elocutionist. Zeldin points out in a historic account that elocutionists focus more on the form (proper grammar/style) rather than depth in conversation. I may now overcome some prejudices I have when people fall out of form.' ‘Perhaps one of the most fascinating ideas he presents is that conversation with like-minded people can become boring. Upon learning this I went straight to someone with conflicting views and had an argument with them. The emotions that came from that conversation were overwhelming and appreciated by both of us. I have the book to thank for this.'  BBC documentary Netherlands documentary Council of Europe

The Future of Work
Zeldin's search for an alternative vision of what work could be, beyond replacing human labour with machines, and beyond shortening working hours so as to leave time for leisure and entertainment, began in the 1990s in a research project for the European Commission.
His starting point was that since most existing jobs and professions were invented long ago, their purpose was to fulfil hopes which were different from those of the present generation, for whom survival, status and skill are insufficient rewards.
He sees a billion young people, over the next few decades, searching not just for jobs, but for more interesting and exciting jobs, and being increasingly demanding as they become more educated and their curiosities range more widely. Because agriculture, industry and the service sectors are governed by the doctrine that reducing staff is the key to efficiency, and because work is no longer an integral part of family, community or spiritual life, as it once was, the young are being challenged to invent new occupations, providing more satisfactions than existing forms.

Zeldin and his colleagues have been making portraits of people at work in many different sectors and at many different levels, to discover the divergences between what employers offer and what employees want or could want if they knew it was possible. This has been followed by trials to test how supermarkets, offices, factories and hotels can expand their priorities so that beyond the commercial transactions on which they concentrate, they can become proactive disseminators of culture and education to both employees and customers, and more inspired stimulants of talent and imagination. Zeldin is also evolving a new set of ambitions for business schools and new academic answers to the increasingly narrow specialisation that both work and education impose.

Gastronomy
After writing a 17,000 word chapter on ‘Eating and Drinking’ in the History of French Passions, Zeldin persuaded his colleagues at St Antony's College Oxford (who acquiesced with sceptical smiles) to appoint a research fellow in the history of gastronomy. The person chosen was a former ambassador, Alan Davidson, who had given up diplomacy to study food, on which he had published remarkable books. Zeldin was determined that gastronomy was as worthy of study in universities as any other of the pleasures of life. Together they founded the Oxford Symposium on Food and Cookery in 1981, which has met annually ever since, bringing together about 200 experts, professional and amateur, from all over the world. A different theme is discussed each year, to the accompaniment of remarkable meals from different countries, and with the proceedings amusingly spiced by the contrasting personalities of Zeldin and Davidson as joint chairmen. In the first thirty years, thirty volumes were published containing the essays contributed by participants. Zeldin took his interest in experimental innovation further by starting a restaurant inside his college, run by a cordon bleu chef, to compete against the college's own more conventional food, and to attract fresh ideas from diners from outside the college. He emphasises that the taste of food is only one part of gastronomy, quoting Brillat-Savarin who exalted not only the art of the kitchen but also the art of the table and the conversation and conviviality it encouraged.

The Oxford Muse Foundation
The Oxford Muse Foundation was established in 2001 to pursue the practical implications of Zeldin's thinking. Its ambition 'to stimulate courage and invention in personal, professional and cultural life' is implemented in three ways. In personal life, it has responded to the superficiality of social intercourse by organising one-to-one conversations between people who do not know one another; and it helps individuals to create sophisticated self-portraits (in prose or in film) to say what they would like others to understand about them, replacing the boasts of curricula vitae with more deeply considered reflections on character, opinions and ambitions. In professional life, it investigates how different forms of work can be reconceived to fulfil the expanding aspirations of a new generation, and it designs small-scale experiments to test how particular industries can look beyond the traditional assumptions of business practice so as to diminish the frustrations and boredom of employment. In cultural life, its goal is to create a new level of postgraduate education that, instead of teaching how to become a narrow specialist, is an introduction to the ways of thinking of people in the many different branches of science, commerce, public service, spirituality and the arts, how they approach problems, how they view the world and what unresolved problems they face, in every civilisation.

Muse Conversations have taken place in twelve countries with participants from every social category, from the World Economic Forum at Davos, the Olympic Games, multinational corporations and public officials to universities, doctors’ patients and shelters for homeless people. Guide to an Unknown City (2004) contains the self-portraits of a wide variety of Oxford residents and Guide to an Unknown University (2006) those of professors, students, alumni, administrators and maintenance staff, revealing what they do not normally tell one another. A new series is devoted to The People of London in their own Words (2014).

The Public Intellectual
Zeldin has often been seen as the outsider who offers an alternative viewpoint. Jacques Delors (president of the European Commission) invited him into his private Think Tank which met annually in Lorient (François Hollande was another member). The Regional Council of the Nord-Pas-de-Calais appointed him to preside over its Planning-the-Future Commission. He was an adviser to the French Millennium Celebrations Commission. Prime Minister Jospin chose him to be the presenter of his international web site and the Minister of Culture Jack Lang to spend a year accompanying him in all his activities. He became a member of the Consultative Committee on European Affairs of the French Government's Planning Commission, a member of the Scientific Committee of the Pôle Universitaire Européen de Lille, and of the Steering Committee of the Centre des Etudes Européennes de Strasbourg. He was president of the Maison du Temps et La Mobilité of Belfort, of the Scientific Committee that awarded the Mécénat Seita scholarships in the social sciences, and of the Festival International de Géographie. Vision Première, the textile industry's organisation that decides each year's fashionable colours, asked him to give the keynote speech at its fair.  He helped to draw up France's legislation as a member of the multi-party Commission formed by President Sarkozy, under the chairmanship of the socialist Jacques Attali. He was a member of the Board of Visionaries, presided by the astronaut Claudie Haigneré, advising Europe's largest Nanotechnology Laboratories on their future development. He participated in debates organised by the French Senate, the National Assembly, various ministries, the national electricity company (EDF), the railway company (SNCF), the Employers Union (Medef), the Young Company Directors (CJD), the National Federation of Small Businesses, the Federation of Private Employers (FEPEM), the major political parties, the National School of Public Health etc.. He has written for many newspapers, broadcast radio talks, and was a commentator on the live television broadcasts of national election results. For several years he wrote a regular column for France's physicians' journal Impact Médecin. The London Sunday Times wrote: ‘In France he is a TV star. In Britain his reputation as a journalist may soon rival his academic renown.’

Zeldin's thinking has been fed and encouraged by invitations to advise decision-makers in finance, law, medicine, IT, consulting, transport, manufacturing, insurance, design, arts, advertising, retailing, energy, human resources, government, and international organisations, and by being appointed a professor honoris causa of HEC, the Paris Business School, and an associate fellow of Oxford University's Said Business School's executive education programme as well as of Green Templeton College, Oxford, whose remit is human welfare in the broadest sense. He has been helped in understanding where the obstacles to innovation are most formidable as a guest of the World Economic Forum, the Australian Future Summit, the Creative Leadership Summit, Mrs Sonia Gandhi's Conference in New Delhi, as an advisor to the Greek Cultural Olympics, a vice-president of Culture Action Europe, a member of the EU commission which established the European Voluntary Service, a participant in the work of the Council of Europe, a member of the BBC Brains Trust and the management committee of the Society of Authors, an Associate of the Demos Think Tank, a Patron of the National Academy of Writing, a Trustee of the Wytham Hall Medical Charity for the Homeless and the Amar International Appeal for Refugees, and a visiting professor at Harvard and the University of Southern California Management Today cited him in its New Guru Guide for the 21st century as ‘one of Britain’s leading intellects’.

Publications
 The Political System of Napoleon III (1958)
 Edited (with Anne Troisier de Diaz) Émile Ollivier, Journal: 1946-1863 (1961)
 Émile Ollivier and the Liberal Empire of Napoleon III (1963)
 Conflicts in French Society: Anticlericalism, Education and Morals in the Nineteenth Century: Essays (1970)
 France, 1848-1945: Volume I - Ambition, Love and Politics (1973) Volume II - Intellect, Taste and Anxiety (1977) (Oxford History of Modern Europe series).  Rearranged and reissued with additional material as:
History of French Passions: vol 1: Ambition and Love; vol 2: Intellect and Pride; vol 3: Taste and Corruption; vol 4: Politics and Anger; vol 5: Anxiety and Hypocrisy (1979-81)
 The French (1982)
 Foreword to Jeremy Jennings, Georges Sorel: The Character and Development of His Thought (1985)
 Introduction to Le tunnel sous la Manche: chronique d'une passion franco-anglaise (1987)
 Happiness (novel) (1988)
 An Intimate History of Humanity (1994)
 Conversation (2000)
 Guide to an Unknown City (2004)
 Guide to an Unknown University (2006)
 Gary Hill & Gerry Judah (with Jenny Blyth) (2007)
 The Hidden Pleasures of Life: A New Way of Remembering the Past and Imagining the Future (2015)

References

External links 

 The Oxford Muse – Zeldin's website
 Feast of Strangers
 Zeldin talks about "Happiness", ICA 1988
 Theodore Zeldin interview by Máirtín Mac Con Iomaire (Oxford Oral History Project)
 

1933 births
Living people
Fellows of the Royal Society of Literature
Alumni of Birkbeck, University of London
Alumni of St Antony's College, Oxford
Alumni of Christ Church, Oxford
Fellows of St Antony's College, Oxford
People educated at Aylesbury Grammar School
British people of Russian-Jewish descent
British historians
Commanders of the Order of the British Empire
Commandeurs of the Légion d'honneur
Commandeurs of the Ordre des Arts et des Lettres
Conversationalists
Elocutionists